The Flying Scissors is a 2009 mockumentary that follows eight entrants in the a fictional National Rock Paper Scissors League (NRPSL) Championship. The film focuses on the quirky but relateable characters and their desire to balance the nuances of everyday life with the dreams of becoming a champion.

Jonah Tulis directed; he also co-wrote the script with Blake J. Harris.

Plot
The Flying Scissors is a mockumentary about the world of competitive “Rock, Paper, Scissors.” The film delves into the lives and daily routines of a wide array of quirky characters who vie to be the best at this unorthodox sport. Each competitor must balance the nuances of their everyday life in hopes of becoming a champion.

The film uses Rock Paper Scissors to satire the current state of professional sports and the modern success of poker.

Cast
Mason Pettit as Phil Stevens
Devin Ratray as The Rock
Todd Susman as Frank Johnson
Matthew Arkin as Alan Pope
Mike Britt as Leon Washington
Keong Sim as Bruce Wong
Jeremy Redleaf as Matty Simms
Sarah Wheeler as Anna Carlson
Benim Foster as David Sandberg
Alex Cranmer as Barry Stine
Madison Arnold as Mac

Reception
In anticipation of the theatrical release, the film played at over 40 colleges around the United States including UCLA, USC, Duke, Syracuse, North Dakota, and Florida. The film received an extremely positive reaction.

A Variety review states that good execution of a lame idea is better than lame execution of a good idea, and that this low-budget comedy turns out to be a showcase for an attractive cast.

References

External links 
 
 

2009 films
American independent films
American mockumentary films
2009 comedy films
2000s English-language films
Films directed by Jonah Tulis
2000s American films